Unga or UNGA may refer to:

Places 
 Unga Island, in Alaska, United States
 Unga, Alaska, a ghost town
 Unga L.T.D., an administrative ward in Tanzania
 Unga Station, in Japan

Other uses 
 Unga (crab), or coconut crab
 Unga (fish), a fish of Cameroon
 Unga (unit), a Scottish land measurement
 United Nations General Assembly, or UNGA
 Unga Group, a flour milling company
 Tēvita ʻUnga (c. 1824 – 1879), Tongan Crown Prince and Prime Minister
 Harvey Unga (born 1988), American football running back

See also
 Oonga (disambiguation)
 Ounga (disambiguation)
 Yunga (disambiguation)